Zmeevo Pass (‘Prohod Zmeevo’ \'pro-hod 'zme-e-vo\) is the ice-covered saddle of elevation 2110 m in Sullivan Heights on the east side of Sentinel Range in Ellsworth Mountains, Antarctica separating Mount Farrell from the ridge of Mount Levack. It is part of the glacial divide between Pulpudeva Glacier and Strinava Glacier.

The feature is named after the settlement of Zmeevo in northeastern and Zmeyovo in southern Bulgaria.

Location
US mapping in 1988.

Maps
 Vinson Massif.  Scale 1:250 000 topographic map.  Reston, Virginia: US Geological Survey, 1988.
 Antarctic Digital Database (ADD). Scale 1:250000 topographic map of Antarctica. Scientific Committee on Antarctic Research (SCAR). Since 1993, regularly updated.

Notes

References
 Zmeevo Pass. SCAR Composite Antarctic Gazetteer.
 Bulgarian Antarctic Gazetteer. Antarctic Place-names Commission. (details in Bulgarian, basic data in English)

External links
 Zmeevo Pass. Copernix satellite image

Mountain passes of Ellsworth Land
Bulgaria and the Antarctic